Mount Arvon at , is the highest natural point in the U.S. state of Michigan. Located in L'Anse Township, Baraga County, Mount Arvon is part of the Huron Mountains. On the list of highest natural points in each U.S. state, Mount Arvon ranks 38th. It is the highest natural point in the East North Central states.

Mount Arvon is a few miles from Mount Curwood, which for years had been designated as Michigan's highest spot until a resurvey in 1982 with modern technology determined that Mount Arvon is  taller than Mount Curwood.

The soils of Mount Arvon are classic podzols which have developed on sandy loam glacial till locally overlain with a loamy or silty mantle. The Munising sandy loam-Michigamme silt loam complex is dominant.

The property is owned by the MeadWestvaco paper company but public access is allowed.

In 2018, the National Oceanic and Atmospheric Administration reported that the highest surface elevation in Michigan was the top of the Tilden Mine waste pile in Marquette County near Ishpeming. At the time, the top of the pile was at slightly above , more than  higher than the summit of Mount Arvon.

See also
 
 
 List of U.S. states by elevation

Footnotes

References

External links

 

Arvon
Arvon
Landforms of Baraga County, Michigan